Bluesquare are a Czech four-member blues rock band originating in Fulnek. Their music draws inspiration from blues, Southern rock, psychedelic rock, among others.

History
Bluesquare formed in 2007 and consists of Štěpán "Cowboy" Gruchala (guitar, vocals), René "GOGO" Gockert (bass), Jiří "Zelí" Zelinka (drums), and Peťusek Hrubiš (saxophone). In 2010, they won the Zajíc music award as the best jazz/blues band in the Moravian-Silesian Region.

The band released their debut album, Sychravé ráno, in 2014.

Band members
 Štěpán Gruchala – guitar, vocals
 René Gockert – bass
 Jiří Zelinka – drums
 Petr Hrubiš – saxophone

Discography
 Sychravé ráno (2014)

References

External links
 

Czech rock music groups
Czech blues musical groups
Czech blues rock musical groups
Musical groups established in 2007
2007 establishments in the Czech Republic